Marmaduke Surfaceblow is a fictional engineer.  His globe-girdling engineering adventures written by Steve Elonka first appeared in Power Magazine in 1948.

Marmaduke is a marine engineer with vast knowledge of machinery. He works out of an office over O'Houlihan's Machine Shop in the Hells Kitchen area of New York City.  His imposing 6 ft 4 in stature is described in every story along with his steelbrush moustache and size 16 "canal boat" shoes. Surfaceblow smokes Ringelmann #5 cigars that produce acrid clouds leaving others teary-eyed.  

The stories often start with Marmaduke gathered with other engineers. One will relate an interesting anecdote, say about a hard starting diesel engine. Marmduke will impatiently "foghorn 'Bilgewater on balky diesels!  I'll tell you about the time I ran a boat engine on water!' '" The story continues with "that did it.  Everyone turned to Marmaduke as he revved up his induced draft fan and filled the room with Ringelman #5 smoke".  The real story then begins relating his exploit. His adventures often place him in a foreign port with poor repair facilities requiring brilliantly simple solutions to problems that have stumped others.

Other times Marmaduke will be "on the beach without a berth" and need money.  Another engineer will present a difficult technical problem that has eluded resolution.  Marmaduke then proposes to fix the problem for a sizable consulting fee, which may be money and/or his favorite drink of Sandpaper Gin. After successfully resolving the problem Marmaduke will "ballast his double-bottoms with Sandpaper Gin." 

Marmaduke's knowledge comes from hands-on experience operating steam power plants and all manner of  machinery.  Later in the series a son, Guy Newcomen Surfaceblow, was introduced.  He is a university-trained engineer who also has field experience that gives him credibility when working with hard-boiled characters in the boonies. 

The character's name was coined from Marmaduke, a Scottish name, and Surfaceblow, which is the action of removing impurities from a steam boiler. Marmaduke Surfaceblow predates Star Trek's Scotty by 17 years. James Doohan explained he proposed a Scottish accent for the character of Enterprise chief engineer because they were the best engineers.

While not stated it is apparent many of the stories were inspired by actual events.

Surfaceblow's adventures were consolidated by Elonka into a single volume "Marmaduke Surfaceblow's Salty Technical Romances", R. E. Krieger Pub. Co, 1979.  Copies are rare and highly sought.

Notes

References
Power Magazine

Fictional engineers